The 729th Air Control Squadron is a Control and Reporting Center (CRC) assigned to the 552d Air Control Group, 552d Air Control Wing. The 729th's mission is focused around providing air control (radar) services for combat air operations. Officially, the 729th provides a mobile, combat-rated, senior radar element of the Theater Air Control System for worldwide contingencies. Additionally the 729th provides combat and control of joint air operations by conducting surveillance identification, weapons control, Battle Management and theater communications data link.

The squadron provides the theater Air Force commander a rapid reaction mobile air control system and control and reporting center during worldwide contingencies.  It also provides command and control of joint air operations through surveillance, identification, weapons control, theater missile defense, battle management and theater communications data links.

Emblem

Description/Blazon
On a disc Azure, a target of two concentric circles and crosshairs Argent, charged with a delta flight symbol point to dexter chief Or, overall a bull couped at the neck Sable, horned and detailed of the second, horns and eye embellished Gules, emitting from the nostrils two lightning bolts of the like; all within a narrow Black border.

Attached above the disc, a Yellow scroll edged with a narrow Black border and inscribed "BEST IN THE FIELD" in Black letters.

Attached below the disc, a Yellow scroll edged with a narrow Black border and inscribed "729TH AIR CONTROL SQ" in Black letters.

Emblem significance
Ultramarine blue and Air Force yellow are the Air Force colors.  Blue alludes to the sky, the primary theater of Air Force operations.  Yellow refers to the sun and the excellence required of Air Force personnel.  The bull symbolizes the strength, stamina, and durability of the squadron.  The smoke snorts as lightning bolts represent the electronic control and surveillance of the skies provided by the squadron.  The stylized aircraft symbolizes the strength of airpower and with the radar scope/target signifies the squadron's worldwide capability for deployment.

References

External links
https://web.archive.org/web/20131203133739/http://www.388fw.acc.af.mil/library/factsheets/factsheet.asp?id=4230
https://web.archive.org/web/20131203003148/http://www.afhra.af.mil/factsheets/factsheet.asp?id=18997

728